Tadeusz  Łysiak (born in 1993) is a Polish filmmaker. He is mostly known for The Dress, his graduation short film from the Warsaw Film School, for which he received a nomination for the Academy Award for Best Live Action Short Film at the 94th Academy Awards.

Life and career 

He was born in 1993 and he is the son of screenwriter Tomasz Łysiak and grandson of writer Waldemar Łysiak. He graduated in Cultural Studies at the University of Warsaw and studied directing at the Warsaw Film School. Tadeusz is currently working on his first long feature Obsession (working title), a psychological  thriller set in Poland.

Filmography 

 The mirror (2017) – writer, director.
 Techno (2017) –  writer, director.
 1920, The Miracle of the Vistula (2020) – director.
 Masha (2020) – second unit director.
 The Dress (2020) – writer, director.

Recognition 
His short filmThe Dress has been nominated for the Academy Award for Best Live Action Short Film for the 94th Academy Awards.

References

External links 
 

Polish filmmakers
1993 births
Living people